The Northeast Coalition for the Liberation of Southern Africa (NECLSA) was an anti-apartheid organization founded in 1977 at Yale University by members of the Black Student Alliance at Yale (BSAY) and students at Rutgers University in response to the massacre of black students by the South African police during the Soweto student uprisings in June 1976.  The organization quickly expanded to a majority membership of white Americans.  At its height, NECLSA became the umbrella organization of Anti-Apartheid committees on some 100 campuses throughout the North East region of the United States.

The organization initiated the South Africa divestment movement on the U.S. university campuses.  The movement was eminently successful in focusing and influencing corporate America's policy towards apartheid South Africa.  It can be argued that NECLSA and its sister organizations in the Mid-West, South and West of the United States, made a pivotal contribution to the eventual abolition of apartheid in South Africa.

External links
 The African Activist Archive Project website includes a description and material of the  Northeast Coalition for the Liberation of Southern Africa

Political advocacy groups in the United States
Opposition to apartheid in South Africa